Giorgi-Malakia Abashidze (died October 15, 1722) was a Georgian nobleman and King of Imereti as George VI (or George V) from 1702 to 1707. He was a member of the prominent Abashidze family.

The youngest son of Prince Paata Abashidze, he served as a priest until about 1684 when he entered politics after the death of his elder brother Paata Abashidze and began aggressively expanding his patrimonial fiefdom. He dispossessed the Chkheidze family of Shorapani, and the Agiashvili of Tsutskhvati, and took control of the royal domain in Upper Imereti. His daughter, Tamar, was married to the two successive kings of Imereti, Alexander IV and George V. During the reign of the latter monarch, Abashidze effectively ran the government and acted as an all-powerful kingmaker. In 1699, he gave his daughter Anika in marriage to King Simon of Imereti, but they divorced in 1700. In 1701, Abashidze compelled King Mamia of Imereti to abdicate and seized the throne for himself. He managed to establish a degree of stability in Imereti and ceased to pay tribute to the Ottoman Empire, triggering a military response in 1703. He also patronized culture and learning. Deposed after a revolt by the nobles, in favour of the rightful Bagrationi king George VII, Abashidze took refuge at the court of Vakhtang VI of Kartli in Tbilisi. He died there in 1722, and was buried in the Katskhi monastery in Imereti.

References
 Вахушти Багратиони (Vakhushti Bagrationi) (1745). История Царства Грузинского: Жизнь Имерети.
David Marshall Lang, The Last Years of the Georgian Monarchy, 1658-1832. New York: Columbia University Press, 1957.

17th-century births
17th-century people from Georgia (country)
18th-century people from Georgia (country)
1722 deaths
Nobility of Georgia (country)
Kings of Imereti
Eastern Orthodox monarchs